George Francis Grimwood LRIBA (1874 - 15 Jan 1938) was an 20th century engineer and architect based in Nottingham.

History

He was born in 1874 in Cardiff, the son of Dennis Grimwood (1833-1904) and Harriet Fellows (b. 1847)

He was articled to William Henry Dashwood Caple in Cardiff from 1889–93, and afterwards remained as his assistant.

He became an engineer and architectural assistant in the Borough Engineer’s department of Cardiff Corporation in 1893 and in 1899 he was employed in the Birmingham Corporation Architects' Department.  He commenced independent practice in 1904 in Monmouth, based at Atheneum Buildings, Monmouth and was Borough Surveyor. In 1910 he became a Licenciate of the Royal Institute of British Architects.

He married Elizabeth Bertha Hoddell, younger daughter of Philip Hoddell of Lewstone, Whitchurch, Herefordshire, on 31 October 1907 at St Swithin’s Church, Ganarew, Herefordshire.  They had one son, Philip Francis Grimwood (1912-2004)

He became an Engineer and Surveyor in Beeston, Nottinghamshire around 1917. and later practiced as an architect with offices on Parliament Street in Nottingham.

Later in life they lived at 12 Park Street, Beeston.

He died on 15 January 1938 at Ruthin Castle, Denbighshire. He was cremated in Birkenhead Crematorium. He left an estate valued at £2,353 3s 2d.

Works
Bungalow, Lavender Grove, Beeston 1923
15 Devonshire Avenue, St John's Grove, Beeston 1923
15-17 Melrose Avenue, Beeston 1924
Bungalow, 14 Hope Street, Beeston 1924
Bungalow, 18 Louis Avenue, Beeston 1924
Bungalow, Manor Avenue, Beeston 1924
30-32 Queen's Road, Beeston 1924
34-36 Queen's Road, Beeston 1924
Billiards Hall, Villa Street, Beeston 1928
Bungalow, Meadow Road, Beeston 1929
29 Meadow Road, Beeston 1929
Bonington Theatre, 98 Nottingham Road, Arnold, Nottingham 1929 (enlargement)
Shops, Lilac Crescent, Beeston 1936
Houses, Long Lane, Attenborough 1937

References

20th-century Welsh architects
Architects from Nottingham
1874 births
1938 deaths
Engineers from Cardiff
Architects from Cardiff